The Otra is the largest river in the Sørlandet region of Norway. It begins in Setesdalsheiene mountains at the lake Breidvatnet in Bykle municipality in Agder county, just south of the border with Vinje municipality in Vestfold og Telemark county. The river then flows south through Bykle, Valle, Bygland, Evje og Hornnes, Iveland, Vennesla, and Kristiansand municipalities. The river empties into the Skagerrak in the center of the city of Kristiansand on the southern coast of Norway.

There are many large lakes along the river including: Åraksfjorden, Byglandsfjorden, Hartevatnet, and Kilefjorden. There are 12 hydroelectric power plants built along the river, which produce much of the electricity for the southern part of Norway.

The salmon do well in the Otra river because the water is not too acidic. The calcareous rocks in the catchment area at the northern end of the Setesdal valley give the water a certain buffer capacity against acidification.

References

External links

Rivers of Agder
Setesdal
Geography of Kristiansand
Vennesla
Iveland
Evje og Hornnes
Bygland
Valle, Norway
Bykle
Rivers of Norway